Daniel 'Dani' Ponce de León García (born 16 May 1991) is a Spanish professional footballer who plays for Gibraltar United as a winger.

Football career
A product of AD Torrejón CF's youth system, Ponce made his senior debuts in the 2010–11 season with Real Ávila CF, in the fourth division. He continued to compete in the fourth level in the following seasons, representing CD Coslada and AD Alcorcón B.

On 20 October 2013 Ponce made his first appearance with the main squad, playing the last 3 minutes in a 0–1 away loss against Real Jaén. He appeared in further five matches during the campaign, and renewed his link with the Madrid side for three years on 11 July of the following year, being also definitely promoted to the first team.

On 16 August 2014 Ponce was loaned to Hungarian Nemzeti Bajnokság I side Újpest FC. However, he returned to his parent club in September, and moved to CF Fuenlabrada on 20 January 2015, also in a temporary deal.

On 26 July 2015 Ponce joined CD Guadalajara.

References

External links

1991 births
Living people
Spanish footballers
Footballers from the Community of Madrid
Association football wingers
Segunda División players
Segunda División B players
Tercera División players
AD Alcorcón B players
AD Alcorcón footballers
CD Guadalajara (Spain) footballers
Gibraltar United F.C. players
Nemzeti Bajnokság I players
Újpest FC players
Tarxien Rainbows F.C. players
Spanish expatriate footballers
Spanish expatriate sportspeople in Hungary
Expatriate footballers in Hungary
Expatriate footballers in Malta